Sinn Sathorn Tower is a skyscraper in Thonburi side, Bangkok. Construction started in 1989. Completed in 1993, there were 255 units, each with a living area of 170. The square meter is 352 square meters, the cost is 2,000 million baht by Sinn Estate Property Co., Ltd. together with many other companies. It was once the tallest building in Thailand, and the tallest on the Thonburi side until taken over by The River in 2011.

Today, Sinn Sathorn Tower is the 34st tallest building in Thailand. It was opened as a rental building. The location of the commercial offices, in 1997 was used as a filming location for the James Bond series,  Tomorrow Never Dies by assuming the head office of Elliot Carver (Jonathan Pryce) in Saigon, Vietnam, where James Bond (Pierce Brosnan) jumped from the top of the building, along with Wai Lin (Michelle Yeoh) by the handcuffs. This is another highlight  scene in the film.

Nearby places
Krung Thonburi BTS Station
Wongwian Yai Station
Taksin Bridge (Sathon Bridge)

See also
List of tallest buildings in Thailand

References

Skyscrapers in Bangkok
Khlong San district
Skyscraper office buildings
1989 establishments in Thailand